Chris (Christiaan) de Ronde (1912 in Schiedam – 1996 in Buenos Aires) was a Dutch–Argentinian chess master.

He was a champion of Rotterdam. He had studied mathematics in Leyden and Paris.

De Ronde played for the Netherlands in the 8th Chess Olympiad at Buenos Aires 1939, scoring 8½ in his 14 games.
After the tournament, during which World War II broke out in Europe (September 1939), De Ronde, along with many other participants of the Olympiad (Miguel Najdorf, Gideon Ståhlberg, et al.) decided to stay permanently in Argentina.

He played in Buenos Aires in 1940, and tied for 12-13th at Buenos Aires (Circulo) 1945 (Miguel Najdorf won).

External links
 Chris de Ronde: a Dutch immortal unearthed

References

1912 births
1996 deaths
Dutch chess players
Argentine chess players
Dutch emigrants to Argentina
People from Schiedam
20th-century chess players